The Nearness of You' is an album by saxophonist Houston Person recorded in 1977 and released on the Muse label.

Reception

Allmusic awarded the album 4 stars noting that "The soulful and always-swinging tenor Houston Person is in typically fine form on this enjoyable LP... A fun date".

Track listing 
 "Pretty Please" (Harold Ousley) – 8:00  
 "Please Mr. Person" (Buddy Johnson) – 4:38  
 "I Hope I Can Love Again" (Ousley) – 5:00  
 "Freddie the Freeloader" (Miles Davis) – 5:29  
 "The Nearness of You" (Hoagy Carmichael, Ned Washington) – 4:59
 "Mean to Me" (Fred E. Ahlert, Roy Turk) – 5:18

Personnel 
Houston Person – tenor saxophone 
Virgil Jones – trumpet
Melvin Sparks – guitar
Charles Earland – organ
Sonny Phillips – electric piano
Mervyn Bronson – bass
Grady Tate – drums
Lawrence Killian – percussion
Ella Johnson – vocals (track 2)

References 

Houston Person albums
1978 albums
Muse Records albums
Albums recorded at Van Gelder Studio